Kaveh Madani is a scientist, activist, and former Iranian politician. He previously served as the Deputy Head of Iran's Department of Environment (also Iran's Deputy Vice President). He also served as the Vice President of the United Nations Environmental Assembly Bureau from 2017 to 2018.

He is known for his work on integrating game theory and decision analysis into water resources management models. His research and outreach activities have influenced water policy in Iran. He also has played a major role in raising public awareness about Iran's water and environmental problems in recent years.

Known as "Iran's expat eco-warrior", he was considered as the "Symbol of Expatriate Return" to Iran during President Rouhani's administration.

He is currently the Director of the United Nations University Institute for Water, Environment and Health (UNU-INWEH), and a Resesrch Professor at the City College of New York. Prior to this, he has held positions at Yale University and Imperial College London.

Life and education 
Kaveh Madani was born in 1981 in Tehran, Iran to the parents working in the water sector. He did primary education in Tehran and received his BSc in Civil Engineering from University of Tabriz. He has a MSc in Water Resources from Lund University in Sweden and a PhD in Civil and Environmental Engineering from the University of California, Davis. He did his post-doctoral studies in Environmental Policy and Economics at the Water Science and Policy Center and the Department of Environmental Sciences of the University of California, Riverside.

He is an Iranian citizen and has frequently denied the claims by the Iranian hardliners about having additional citizenships.

Academic career  
Kaveh Madani is a Henry Hart Rice Senior Fellow at the Yale University's MacMillan Center for International and Area Studies and a Visiting Professor at the Centre for Environmental Policy of Imperial College London. He was an assistant professor at the University of Central Florida before joining Imperial College in 2013. He worked at Imperial College as a Lecturer (Assistant Professor) in Environmental Management (2013-2015), Senior Lecturer (Associate Professor) in Environmental Management (2015-2016), and Reader in Systems Analysis and Policy (2016-2017) before joining politics. Since 2017, he has been associated with Imperial College as a Visiting Reader (2017-2018) and a Visiting Professor (full) (2018–present). He served as the Centre for Environmental Policy's Director of Alumni from 2014 to 2017.

He has more than 200 publications and is a  EWRI (American Society of Civil Engineers) Fellow.

Political career  
In 2017, his name appeared in the media, including Shargh, as one of the candidates with strong support from the Iranian environmental NGOs and activists to become Iran's Minister of Energy after Hamid Chitchian in Hassan Rouhani's second presidency term. Madani denied this news later in an interview</ref> with the Mehr News Agency.

He was appointed by Issa Kalantari as the Deputy for International Affairs, Innovation and Socio-cultural Engagement of Iran's Department of Environment in 2017. From 2017 to 2018, he served as the Deputy Vice President of Iran in his position as the Deputy Head of Iran's Department of Environment and the Chief of Iran's Department of Environment's International Affairs and Conventions Center. He was interrogated many times during his tenure in Iran and was arrested by the Islamic Revolutionary Guard Corps (IRGC) in February 2018. In April 2018, he resigned from his political post and revealed that he was kept under surveillance by the Iranian intelligence services and hardliners since his return to Iran.

In Iran, he served as the Chair of the National Committee on International Climate Change Negotiations, Vice President of the National Committee of Sustainable Development, Member of the Supreme Council of Iran's House of Farmers, Member of Iran's Supreme Water Council, and Member of the Iran-Afghanistan Negotiations Workgroup on Water. He led Iran's delegation in the 23rd United Nations Climate Change Conference (COP23) and the 3rd Session of the United Nations Environment Assembly (UNEA-3).

Campaigns on Waste and Plastic 
By running a national campaign on waste, he tried to raise public awareness about waste and plastic pollution in Iran. He was the initiator of the popular Bi-Zobaleh (No Waste) challenge, a social game that reminded both citizens and decision makers about their responsibilities on waste using the “Let's Start with Ourselves” slogan.

Bi-Zobaleh turned into a viral social media game in Iran with many celebrities, top politicians, influential figures, activists and the public from all walks of life joining the challenge from different parts of the country, sharing their solutions and actions on waste reduction in the environment. The move created national sensitivity to the waste issue, which subsequently encouraged many public waste collection events around the country followed by plastic bottled water bans in some city councils, including major cities like Tabriz, Rasht and Isfahan.

Among the Iranian public figures and celebrities who attended the Bi-Zobaleh Challenge are Mitra Hajjar, Pejman Jamshidi, Mohammad Javad Zarif, Mohammad-Javad Azari Jahromi, Shahindokht Molaverdi, Reza Sadeghi, Mohammad Rezs Aref, Mohammad Bathaei, Issa Kalantari, Reza Yazdani, Tayebeh Siavoshi, Ayatollah Seyyed Mohammad Ali Al-Hashem,  Pantea Bahram, and Roya Nonahali.

Awards 
He has received several awards for his research contributions, teaching innovations, and humanitarian activities.

New Face of Civil Engineering (ASCE) 
In 2012, the American Society of Civil Engineers (ASCE) introduced him as one of the 10 "New Faces of Civil Engineering" for "work and personal achievements representing the bold and humanitarian future of civil engineering”.

Arne Richter Award for Outstanding Young Scientists (EGU) 
He received the Arne Richter Award for Outstanding Young Scientists from the European Geosciences Union (EGU) in 2016 for "fundamental contributions to integrating game theory and decision analysis into water management models"

Walter L. Huber Civil Engineering Research Prize (ASCE) 
He received the Walter L. Huber prize for "groundbreaking research in developing methods for the allocation of scarce water resources merging conflict-resolution and game-theoretic concepts for application to complex water resources systems”, introducing "novel insight on how to achieve binding, long-term solutions to complex water resources problems", and “outstanding leadership in the application of systems analysis to environmental, water and energy resource problems.”

Hydrologic Sciences Early Career Award (AGU) 
He received the Hydrologic Sciences Early Career Award from the American Geophysical Union (AGU) in 2019 for "fundamental contributions to integrating game theory and decision analysis methods into conventional water resources systems models" and "proven dedication to education, outreach, raising public awareness on environmental and climate issues, and selfless service to the hydrologic sciences community has had major societal impacts."

Ambassador Award (AGU) 
Kaveh Madani awarded the American Geophysical Union 2020 Ambassador Award for his contributions and leadership in research, education and outreach in the Earth and space science  and for "his selfless service and outstanding societal impacts as an ambassador of the hydrologic sciences community in the real world".

References

External links 
 He returned home to Iran to help its environment - then fled after falling afoul of hard-liners (Reuters)

1981 births
Living people
University of California, Davis alumni
Iranian civil engineers
Academics of Imperial College London
University of Central Florida faculty
Iranian environmentalists
Lund University alumni
University of Tabriz alumni
Scientists from Tehran